Elodie Rousseau Forwood (born 24 June 1998) is an Australian female acrobatic gymnast. With partners Elizabeth Jacobs, Amy Lang and Rousseau Forwood achieved 6th in the 2014 Acrobatic Gymnastics World Championships.

References

1998 births
Living people
Australian acrobatic gymnasts
Female acrobatic gymnasts